The Cat's Out is a Silly Symphonies animated Disney short film. It was released in 1931. The Cat's Out was a working title that survives on an existing vault print; the short was originally copyrighted and released as The Cat's Nightmare.

Plot
The cartoon takes place at night near a dainty-looking cottage. The family cat is let out for the night and encounters much hardship (a boot gets thrown onto his head while he is on the fencepost). He catches a bird singing atop the weathervane of the roof, but it flies off, pulling the cat and weathervane from the roof and knocking the cat out. The cat then has a vision of giant birds bullying him and from then on everything seems to come to life and torment him, including a bunch of owls, a living water pump and dancing scarecrow, a swarm of bats, six giant spiders, two living trees and another giant bird. The whole thing turns out to be a nightmare, the cat is delighted and decides to go back into the cottage and is thrown out again. He sticks his tongue out at the welcome mat and marches away, this leads the cartoon to an end.

Reception
Motion Picture Herald (October 3, 1931): "A clever piece of cartoon work, typical Silly Symphony number. The theme is as the title suggests, and animators have taken full advantage of its laugh-making possibilities."

Variety (October 27, 1931): "One of Walt Disney's Silly Symphony series and a beaut. Score is good and penmanship snappy, plus having some new ideas. Couple of good laughs help."

Music
Some of the music includes the popular song "For He's a Jolly Good Fellow", and a portion of the Civil War era song "Listen to the Mockingbird".

Home media
The short was released on December 19, 2006, on Walt Disney Treasures: More Silly Symphonies, Volume Two.

References

External links
 

1931 films
1931 short films
1930s Disney animated short films
Films directed by Wilfred Jackson
Films produced by Walt Disney
Silly Symphonies
1931 animated films
American black-and-white films
Columbia Pictures short films
Columbia Pictures animated short films
American animated short films
Animated films about cats
Animated films without speech
1930s American films